The Mitsubishi 4A3 engine is a range of alloy-headed inline four-cylinder engines from Mitsubishi Motors, introduced in 1993 in the sixth generation of their Mitsubishi Minica kei car. It shares a  bore pitch with the 3G8-series three-cylinder engines, but has a considerably shorter stroke so as to stay beneath the 660 cc limit imposed by the Kei class.

A  version was made available in 1997 for larger cars, and was subsequently fitted to the Mitsubishi Pistachio, (and Pajero JR), a limited production car based on the kei class Minica equipped with the company's Automatic Stop-Go (ASG) system for cutting the engine when idling.

4A30
Displacement — 
Bore x Stroke — 
Fuel type — Unleaded regular gasoline

659 cc Electronic carburettor (1993)
Engine type — Inline 4-cylinder SOHC 16v
Fuel system — Electro carburettor
Compression ratio — 10.0:1
Power —  at 7500 rpm
Torque —  at 5500 rpm

659 cc SOHC (1993)
Engine type — Inline 4-cylinder SOHC 16v
Fuel system — ECI multiple
Compression ratio — 10.0:1
Power —  at 7000 rpm
Torque —  at 5000 rpm

659 cc DOHC turbo (1993)
Engine type — Inline 4-cylinder DOHC 20v
Fuel system — ECI multiple
Compression ratio — 8.5:1
Power —  at 7000 rpm
Torque —  at 3500 rpm

4A31
Displacement — 
Bore x Stroke — 
Fuel type — Unleaded regular gasoline

1094 cc SOHC (1997)
Engine type — Inline 4-cylinder SOHC 16v
Fuel system — ECI multiple
Compression ratio — 9.5:1
Power —  at 6000 rpm
Torque —  at 4000 rpm

1094 cc GDI (1999)
Engine type — Inline 4-cylinder DOHC 16v
Fuel system — GDI Direct Injection
Compression ratio — 11.0:1
Power —  at 6000 rpm
Torque —  at 4000 rpm

See also
 List of Mitsubishi engines

References

4A3
Straight-four engines
Gasoline engines by model